Two ships of the Royal Navy have borne the name HMS Lotus, after the Lotus flower:

 , a  launched in 1942.  She was lent to the Free French Navy between 1942 and 1947, and renamed .  She was sold for scrapping in 1947 and broken up in 1951.
 , a Flower-class corvette, previously named HMS Phlox, but renamed after the previous HMS Lotus was transferred.  She was launched in 1942 and sold in 1947.

Royal Navy ship names